L’uomo senza memoria (translation: The Man Without a Memory), internationally released as Puzzle, is a 1974 Italian giallo film directed by Duccio Tessari. It was written by Ernesto Gastaldi.  La Stampa defined the film as "full of ideas and with a strong storyline".

Cast 
 Luc Merenda as Ted Walden 
 Senta Berger as  Sara Grimaldi
 Umberto Orsini as  Daniel 
 Anita Strindberg as  Mary Caine 
 Bruno Corazzari as  George 
 Rosario Borelli as  Poliziotto 
 Manfred Freyberger as  Philip 
 Tom Felleghy as  Dr. Archibald T. Wildgate

References

External links

1974 films
Films about amnesia
Films directed by Duccio Tessari
Giallo films
Films scored by Gianni Ferrio
1970s crime thriller films
1970s Italian films